Eva is a 1958 Austrian comedy film directed by Rolf Thiele. It was entered into the 1959 Cannes Film Festival.

Cast
 Romy Schneider as Nicole
 Carlos Thompson as Irving
 Magda Schneider as Dassou
 Gertraud Jesserer as Brigitte
 Alfred Costas as Thomas
 Richard Eybner (as Richard Eÿbner)
 Rudolf Forster
 Fritz Heller
 Benno Hoffmann
 Helmut Lohner
 Erni Mangold
 Josef Meinrad
 Dorothea Neff
 Guido Wieland

References

External links

1958 films
Austrian comedy films
1950s German-language films
1958 comedy films
Films directed by Rolf Thiele
UFA GmbH films